Elaine Cohen is an American researcher in geometric modeling and computer graphics, known for her pioneering research on B-splines. She is a professor in the school of computing at the University of Utah.

Education and career
Cohen graduated from Vassar College in 1968, with a bachelor's degree in mathematics. She went to Syracuse University for graduate study in mathematics, earning a master's degree in 1970 and completing her doctorate in 1974.
Her dissertation, On the Degree of Approximation of a Function by Partial Sums of its Fourier Series, concerned approximation theory, and was supervised by Daniel Waterman.

At the University of Utah, Cohen became the first woman to gain tenure at the School of Engineering.

Contributions
With Richard F. Riesenfeld and Gershon Elber, Cohen is the author of the book Geometric Modeling with Splines: An Introduction (AK Peters, 2001).

She has also contributed to the development of the Utah teapot, improving it from a two-dimensional surface with no thickness to a bona-fide three-dimensional object.

Recognition
In 2005, the YWCA of Salt Lake City gave Cohen their Outstanding Achievement Award.
In 2009, Cohen and Riesenfeld were awarded the Pierre Bézier Award of the Solid Modeling Association for their work on B-splines in computer aided geometric design.

References

Year of birth missing (living people)
Living people
American computer scientists
American women computer scientists
20th-century American mathematicians
21st-century American mathematicians
American women mathematicians
Vassar College alumni
Syracuse University alumni
University of Utah faculty
20th-century women mathematicians
21st-century women mathematicians
Mathematicians from New York (state)
20th-century American women
21st-century American women